The 2003 Colorado Springs mayoral election took place on April 1, 2003, to elect the mayor of Colorado Springs, Colorado. The election was held concurrently with various other local elections. The election was officially nonpartisan.

Results

References

2003
2003 Colorado elections
2003 United States mayoral elections